The Japan men's national under-18 ice hockey team is controlled by the Japan Ice Hockey Federation, a member of the International Ice Hockey Federation. The team represents Japan at the IIHF World U18 Championships. Japan enjoyed great success at the now defunct IIHF Asian Oceanic U18 Championships, winning a total of 16 medals, including 10 golds.

International competitions

IIHF Asian Oceanic U18 Championships

1984:  1st place
1985:  1st place
1986:  1st place
1987:  3rd place
1988:  2nd place
1989:  1st place
1990:  1st place
1991:  1st place

1992:  1st place
1993:  2nd place
1994:  3rd place
1995:  1st place
1996:  3rd place
1997:  1st place
1998:  2nd place
1999:  1st place
2000-2002: Did not participate

IIHF World U18 Championships

1999: Qualified for Pool B
2000: 4th in Pool B
2001: 3rd in Division I
2002: 7th in Division I
2003: 5th in Division I Group A
2004: 2nd in Division I Group B
2005: 5th in Division I Group B

2006: 3rd in Division I Group B
2007: 2nd in Division I Group B
2008: 5th in Division I Group B
2009: 5th in Division I Group B
2010: 3rd in Division I Group A
2011: Did not participate
2012: 6th in Division I Group A

External links
Japan at IIHF.com

Ice hockey in Japan
National under-18 ice hockey teams
Ice hockey